Makran was an autonomous princely state in a subsidiary alliance with British India until 1947, before being absorbed as an autonomous princely state of Pakistan. It ceased to exist in 1955. It was located in the extreme southwest of present-day Pakistan, an area now occupied by the districts of Gwadar, Kech and Panjgur. The state did not include the enclave of Omani Gwadar, which was under Omani rule until 1958.

See also 
 Khanate of Kalat
 Baluchistan States Union

References

States and territories established in the 18th century
States and territories disestablished in 1955
Princely states of Pakistan
Princely states of India
18th-century establishments in India
1955 disestablishments in Pakistan